The marriage age in the United States is the minimum age at which a person can marry in the United States as a right, or with parental consent or other authorization. This age is set by each state and territory, either by statute or where the common law applies. The general marriage age (lacking authorization for an exception) is 18 years of age in all states except Nebraska, where the general marriage age is 19, and Mississippi, where the general marriage age is 21. The general marriage age is commonly the age of majority, though in Alabama the general marriage age is 18 while the age of majority is 19.

In recent years, the trend has been to adjust the general marriage age downward and to raise the age for women to that of men. Until 1971, approximately 80% of states had a general marriage age of 18 for women, while for men the general marriage age was 21 in approximately 85% of states.

When at least one of the marriage partners is under the general marriage age, the marriage is considered underage. Seven states completely ban underage marriage: Delaware, Massachusetts, Minnesota, New Jersey, New York, Pennsylvania and Rhode Island. The other states may require the underage partner to obtain either parental consent, judicial authorization, or both, or rely on "exceptional circumstances". The minimum underage marriage age, when all mitigating circumstances are taken into account, commonly ranges from 15 to 17. Nine states do not allow a person over 21 to marry an underage person. As of February 2023, seven states do not set any minimum age for marriage.

In many states, a minor's marriage automatically emancipates the minor, or increases their legal rights beyond allowing the minor to consent to certain medical treatments.

History

Colonial America

Marriage age
The minimum marriage age was 12 years for females and 14 years for males under English civil law until 1753. By default, these provisions became the minimum marriage ages in colonial America. The English Marriage Act 1753 required a marriage to be covered by a license (requiring parental consent for those under 21) or the publication of banns (which parents of those under 21 could forbid). Additionally, the Church of England dictated that both the bride and groom must be at least 21 years of age to marry without the consent of their families. English common law inherited from England remained in force in the United States unless and until a specific state enacted a law to replace or modify it.

Age of consent
In 1275, in England, as part of the rape law, the Statute of Westminster 1275, it was a misdemeanor to "ravish" a "maiden within age", whether with or without her consent. The phrase "within age" was interpreted by jurist Sir Edward Coke to mean the age of marriage, which at the time was 12 years. A 1576 law imposed more severe punishments for ravishing a girl for which the age of consent was set at 10 years. Jurist Sir Matthew Hale stated that both rape laws were valid at the same time.. Under English common law the age of consent, apart of the law of rape, was 10 or 12 years and rape was defined as forceful sexual intercourse with a woman against her will. To convict a man of rape, both force and lack of consent had to be proven, except in the case of a girl who was under the age of consent. Since the age of consent applied in all circumstances, not just in physical assaults, the law also made it impossible for a girl under 12 years to consent to sexual activity. There was one exception: a man's acts with his wife (females over 12 years), to which rape law did not apply.

United States

Marriage age
English common law applied in each the United States jurisdiction unless and until a state statute replaced or modified it. In the United States, especially in recent years, the general marriage age has been revised downward so that they are now between 18 and 21 years of age.

There are three sets of marriage ages: 1) general marriage age, 2) the minimum marriage age set by statute and 3) minimum marriage age set by the common law. There are three sets of laws specifying minimum age requirements for marriage: 1) the minimum age with parental and judicial or court consent, 2) the minimum age with parental consent, and 3) the minimum age without parental consent.

There is little variation over time or across states in the laws without parental consent. Prior to 1971, approximately 80% of states specified an age of 18 for marriage without parental consent for women, and approximately 85% specified an age of 21 for men.

In states without a legislated minimum, common law (which specifies a minimum of 12 years old for females and 14 years old for males) prevails; the estimated effect of a common law is similar to a legislated minimum of 13 or less.

In California, the governing law is found in California Family Code sections 302 and 304 (2019): "An unmarried person under 18 years of age may be issued a marriage license upon obtaining a court order granting permission to the underage person or persons to marry, in accordance with the requirements described in Section 304." Historically, Section 56 of the California Civil Code (1872) fixed 15 as the age at which a female could marry without parental consent. In 1921, the age was raised to 18.

Age of consent

In Delaware, the age of consent was 10 years until 1871 when it was lowered to 7 years. Under the 1871 law, the penalty for sex with a girl below the age of consent was death.

In 1880, 37 states set the age of consent at 10 years, 10 states set an age of consent at 12 years, and Delaware had an age of consent of 7 years.

In California, early statutes forbade sexual intercourse with females under the age of 10, following the English statute of 1576. In 1889, the California statute was amended to raise the age to 14 years and the age was raised to 16 in 1897.

In the late-19th century, a "social purity movement" composed of Christian feminist reform groups began advocating a raise in the age of consent to 16, with the goal of raising it ultimately to 18. By 1920, 26 states had an age of consent of 16, 21 states had an age of consent of 18, and one state (Georgia) had an age of consent of 14.

Alaska became the 49th state in 1959, with the age of consent being 16 years. Hawaii became the 50th state in 1959, with the age of consent being 14 years.

Georgia raised its age of consent from 14 to 16 in 1995 as did Hawaii in 2001. Colorado lowered its age of consent to 15 in 1971, after it lowered the age of majority from 21 to 18 years.

As of August 1, 2018, the age of consent in each state in the United States was either 16 years, 17 years, or 18 years.

Underage marriage
When at least one of the marriage partners is under the general marriage age, the marriage is considered underage and may require parental consent and/or judicial authorization. Also, adolescents can marry in "exceptional circumstances”.

In the 50 states
Delaware, Pennsylvania, Massachusetts, Minnesota, Rhode Island, New York, and New Jersey do not allow underage marriage. The other states allow an underage person to marry in the following circumstances:

If one or more of the following apply:
 consent of the parents or legal guardians of the minor
 consent of a court clerk or judge
 if the minor is emancipated.
Or in exceptional circumstances if one or more of the following circumstances apply:
consent of a superior court judge, rather than a local judge, is required
 if one of the parties is pregnant
 if the minor has given birth to a child

In 6 states, a person who is 21 years old cannot marry a person under 18 years old: Missouri, Arizona, Colorado, Idaho, Louisiana, Nevada. In one state, Florida, a person who is 20 cannot marry a person under 18 years old. In 3 states – Georgia, Tennessee and Ohio – a person who is 22 cannot marry a person under 18 years old. Indiana is nearly the same, although a person who is 21 can marry a person who is 17 years old.

Minimum age in 50 states:
 2 states have a minimum age of 15: Hawaii and Kansas.
 25 states have a minimum age of 16.
 9 states have a minimum age of 17.
 7 states have no official minimum age, but still require either parental consent, court approval or both: California, Michigan, Mississippi, New Mexico, Oklahoma, West Virginia, and Washington.
 7 states have a minimum age of 18, which is the same as their general age: Delaware, Minnesota, New Jersey, New York, Massachusetts, Rhode Island and Pennsylvania.

From 2017 to 2023, several states changed their law to set a minimum age, or to raise their minimum age.

In Massachusetts, the minimum marriage age is 18. Prior to July 29, 2022, adolescents could be married with judicial consent. Unlike many other states, in Massachusetts an adolescent's marriage did not automatically emancipate the minor, or increase his or her legal rights beyond allowing the minor to consent to certain medical treatments.

In the territories and federal district
Puerto Rico is a territory of the United States, and its people are American citizens. In Puerto Rico, the general marriage age is 21 as that is the age of majority. The general marriage age in Puerto Rico is 21 or 18 with parental consent. In Guam, the general age is 18, but 16-year-olds can get married with the consent of at least one parent or guardian. In American Samoa, since September 2018, the marriage age has been 18 for both sexes. Previously, the marriage age for females was 14. American Samoa does not allow underage marriages. In the District of Columbia, the general age is 18, but 16-year-olds may marry with exceptions. In the U.S. Virgin Islands, since January 2020, the marriage age has been 18 for both sexes. Prior to January 2020, the marriage age was 14 for females and 16 for males. In the Northern Mariana Islands, males must be 18 to marry, while females can marry at 16 with parental consent.

List

States

District of Columbia and United States Territories

See also
 Age of majority
 Minor (law)
 Teenage marriage
 Ages of consent in the United States
 Marriageable age

References

Adolescence in the United States
United States law-related lists
Age
Sex laws
Statutory law
Youth rights in the United States
United States